Evgheni Pațula (born 19 March 1983) is a retired Moldovan football striker.

References

1983 births
Living people
Moldovan footballers
FC Sheriff Tiraspol players
FC Tiraspol players
FC Tighina players
Association football forwards
Moldova international footballers